Pix Brook is a stream that flows through Letchworth Garden City in Hertfordshire, Stotfold in Bedfordshire, and meets the River Hiz north of Arlesey.

Rivers of Hertfordshire
Letchworth
Rivers of Bedfordshire